Tonkinoscaris excisicollis is a species of beetle in the family Carabidae, the only species in the genus Tonkinoscaris.

References

Scaritinae